Jinlan Reservoir, also known as Jinlantang Reservoir, is a large reservoir located in Langya Town of Jinhua, Zhejiang, China. The reservoir is the source of the Baisha Stream, a tributary of Jinhua River.

History
Construction of Jinlan Reservoir, designed by the local government, commenced in April 1958 and was completed in September 1960.

Dam

Function
Jinlan Reservoir belongs to the first grade water source protection area and is part of Jinhua's water supply network.

The reservoir provides drinking water and water for irrigation and recreational activities.

Public Access  
Andi Reservoir open to visitors for free. Fishing and hiking are activities around the reservoir.

Gallery

References

Geography of Jinhua
Tourist attractions in Jinhua
Reservoirs in Zhejiang